Platomma nigrantior is a species of tephritid or fruit flies in the genus Platomma of the family Tephritidae.

Distribution
South Africa.

References

Tephritinae
Insects described in 1963
Diptera of Africa